Andrea Tabanelli (16 April 1961 – 27 October 2020) was an Italian wheelchair curler.

Tabanelli died on 27 October 2020 at the age of 59.

Biography
Tabanelli was born in Perugia. He was a member (third) of the Italian wheelchair curling team at the 2006 Winter Paralympics in Torino. He was the skip of the Italian team at the 2010 Winter Paralympics in Vancouver.

References

External links
 
 Profile at the Official Website for the 2010 Winter Paralympics in Vancouver

1961 births
2020 deaths
Sportspeople from Perugia
Italian male curlers
Italian wheelchair curlers
Paralympic wheelchair curlers of Italy
Wheelchair curlers at the 2010 Winter Paralympics
Place of birth missing